The following is a timeline of the history of the city of Ankara, Ankara Province, Turkey.

Prior to 14th century

 546 BCE – Achaemenid Persians in power (approximate date).
 334 BCE – City taken by forces of Alexander III of Macedon.
 278 BCE – Celtic Galatians in power.
 25 BCE – City taken by forces of Augustus and becomes part of the Roman Empire.
 20 BCE – Monumentum Ancyranum built.
 3rd century CE – City besieged by Gothic forces.
 272 CE – City becomes part of Roman Empire again.
 314 – Church council held.
 362 – Julian (emperor) of Roman Empire visits city; "Column of Julian" erected.
 7th century – City becomes capital of the Opsician Theme.
 8th century – City becomes capital of the Bucellarian Theme.
 1073 – City becomes part of the Seljuq Empire.
 1101 – Ankara Castle captured by the Crusaders.
 1227 – Ankara Castle captured by the Seljuqs.

14th–19th centuries

 1356 – City taken by forces of Ottoman Orhan I.
 1402 – 20 July: Battle of Ankara fought at Çubuk; Turkic Timur takes city.
 1403 – Ottomans in power again.
 1471 – Mahmut Paşa Bedesteni built.
 1523 – Çengel Han built.
 1566 – Cenabi Ahmed Pasa Mosque built.
 1688 – Earthquake.
 1832 – Ankara Castle renovated.
 1864 – City becomes capital of the Ankara Vilayet.
 1890 – Population: 27,825 (approximate).
 1893 – Istanbul-Ankara railway constructed.

20th century

 1920
 23 April: Government of the Grand National Assembly established.
 Hakimiyet-i Milliye newspaper begins publication.
 1923
 13 October: City becomes capital of the Republic of Turkey.
 Gençlerbirliği S.K. football club formed.
 1924
 Population: 35,000 (approximate).
 Musiki Muallim Mektebi opens.
 Presidential Symphony Orchestra headquartered in Ankara.
 1925
 Forest Farm established.
 Pembe Köşk becomes Turkish presidential residence.
 1927
 Ankara Palas opens.
 Population: 44,553.
 Victory Monument erected.
 1930
 City renamed "Ankara."
 Ethnography Museum of Ankara founded.
 State Art and Sculpture Museum built.
 1932 – Pink Villa built.
 1933 – Ankara Zoo established.
 1935 – Ankara 19 Mayıs Stadium built.
 1937 – Ankara Central Station inaugurated.
 1938 – November: State funeral of Mustafa Kemal Atatürk held.
 1940 – State Conservatory established.
 1943 – Gençlik Parkı (park) and Museum of Anatolian Civilizations opens.
 1945 – Population: 226,712.
 1946 – University of Ankara founded.
 1948 – Ankara Opera House inaugurated.
 1950 – Population: 286,781.
 1953 – Anıtkabir mausoleum of Atatürk erected.
 1955 – Esenboğa Airport begins operating.
 1956 – Middle East Technical University.
 1961 – Turkish Grand National Assembly Museum opens.
 1967 – Hacettepe University founded.
 1971 – Barıṣ newspaper begins publication.
 1973 – Population: 1,461,345 city; 1,553,897 urban agglomeration (approximate).
 1974 – Yenikent Asaş Stadium built.
 1978 – 9 October: Bahçelievler massacre.
 1982 – 7 August: Esenboğa International Airport attack.
 1983 – 16 January: Airplane accident.
 1984
 City administration reorganized.
 Mehmet Altınsoy becomes mayor of Greater Ankara.
 Bilkent University founded.
 Turkish Aerospace Industries headquartered in Ankara.
 Population: 2,019,000 (estimate).
 1987 – Kocatepe Mosque built.
 1989
 National Assembly Mosque and Atakule Tower built.
 Murat Karayalçın becomes mayor.
 1990 – March: Bombings.
 1991 – Sheraton Ankara in business.
 1993
 Bilkent Symphony Orchestra founded.
 Vedat Aydın becomes mayor.
 1994 – Melih Gökçek becomes mayor.
 1997 – Ankara Metro begins operating.

21st century

 2003 – Göksu Park was opened.
 2004 – Wonderland Ankara was opened.
 2005 – Çengelhan Rahmi M. Koç Museum of technology established.
 2006 – 17 May: Turkish Council of State shooting.
 2007
 22 May: 2007 Ankara bombing.
 Population: 3,953,344 (urban)
 2009 – Eskişehir-Ankara Yüksek Hızlı Tren high-speed railway begins operating.
 2010
 Cer Modern museum inaugurated.
 Ankara Arena was opened for use.
 11 March: The events of the 21st Ankara International Film Festival started.
 8 April: Başkent Volleyball Hall was opened.
 28 August: 2010 FIBA World Championship Group C matches started in Ankara.
 2011
 Kumrular Street attack was carried out by the PKK. 5 civilians lost their lives.
 17 March: The events of the 22nd Ankara International Film Festival started.
 2012 - Population: 4,417,522.
 2013
 1 February: 2013 United States embassy bombing in Ankara.
 19 April: Ahmet Hamdi Akseki Mosque was opened.
 May–June: 2013 Taksim Gezi Park protests.
 22 May: 2013 Turkish Cup Final match played in Ankara.
 5 December: TCDD Open Air Steam Locomotive Museum was closed to use.
 2014
 12 February: M3 (Ankara metro) was opened for use.
 7 March: Within 2 thousand 117 pieces of toys where "Ankapark" was opened to the public.
 13 March: M2 (Ankara metro) was opened for use.
 5 August: Ankara-Istanbul high-speed railway opened for service.
 17 October: It opened for use as it renovated Ottoman Stadium.
 20 October: Presidential Palace was opened.
 2015
 1 January: Battle of Sakarya Historical National Park was opened for use.
 10 October: 86 die, 186 are injured from two explosions near peace rally.
 31 October: Cebeci İnönü Stadium was closed to use.
 2016
 17 February: 2016 Ankara Merasim Street bombing attack
 13 March: 2016 Ankara Güvenpark-Kızılay Square bombing attack
 19 December: Andrei Karlov was assassinated.
 25 December: The 2016 Ankara Cup event was held.
 2017
 5 January: Otoyol 21 project 5th (Niğde-Pozantı) was prepared.
 Population: 5,445,026 (estimate, urban agglomeration).

Images

See also

 History of Ankara
 List of mayors of Ankara
 List of universities in Ankara
 Timelines of other cities in Turkey: Bursa, Istanbul, Izmir

References

This article incorporates information from the Turkish Wikipedia.

Bibliography

Published in 19th century
 
 
 
 
 

Published in 20th century
 
 
  O. Altaban and M. Güvenç. “Urban Planning in Ankara,” Cities: The International Journal of Urban Policy and Planning 7, no. 2 (1990)
 
 Contesting Urban Space in Early Republican Ankara. Zeynep Kezer. Journal of Architectural Education 01/1998. .
 

Published in 21st century

External links

Timeline
ankara
Ankara